Pseudorhiza is a genus of cnidarians belonging to the family Lychnorhizidae.

The species of this genus are found in Australia.

Species:

Pseudorhiza aurosa 
Pseudorhiza haeckeli

References

Scyphozoan genera
Lychnorhizidae